Louis-Sébastien Lebrun (10 December 1764 in Paris - 27 June 1829 idem) was a French opera singer and composer.

Biography 
As a tenor, he wrote the music of several operas and scenes on booklets, among others, of Charles-Guillaume Étienne, Armand-François Chateauvieux, Armand Croizette, Sewrin and François Bernard-Valville, as well as the music of songs, masses and ariettes.

External links 
 Le rossignol, opéra-comique on Data.bnf.fr
 Mort d'Abel (La) 1787 Louis Sébastien Lebrun on Musicalics
 LEBRUN Louis-Sébastien Marcelin Opéra Ouverture Piano ca1800 on Partitions anciennes
 Biography
 LEBRUN Louis Sébastien (1764-1829) on "Amis et passionnés du Père Lachaise"
 Lebrun, Louis-Sébastien stage works
 Lebrun, Louis-Sébastien biography
 Le rossignol, one-act opéra comique on Gallica
 Marcellin on archive.org
 Zéloïde, two act opera on archive.org

1764 births
1829 deaths
Musicians from Paris
French operatic tenors
French opera composers
Male opera composers
Burials at Père Lachaise Cemetery